Walid Amber Esmail  (Arabic:وليد عمبر) (born 11 January 1993) is an Emirati footballer. He currently plays as a winger for Al Dhafra on loan from Ittihad Kalba .

References

External links
 

Emirati footballers
1993 births
Living people
Al Ahli Club (Dubai) players
Emirates Club players
Shabab Al-Ahli Club players
Al-Ittihad Kalba SC players
Al Dhafra FC players
UAE Pro League players
Association football wingers
Footballers at the 2014 Asian Games
Asian Games competitors for the United Arab Emirates